1965–1980 is the sole studio album by Basement 5, released in 1980 by record label Antilles. It was produced by Martin Hannett. Original drummer Tony Thompson left the band on the first day of the album sessions. Session musician Charley Charles played drums on the album and got a "special thanks" in the album credits. New drummer Richard Dudanski who joined after the recording got a band member credit.

Track listing
All lyrics and rhythms by Basement 5 (Tony Thompson, Dennis Morris, Herman Ezekiel "Leo" Williams and Humphrey "JR" Murray)
"Riot"
"No Ball Games"
"Hard Work"
"Immigration"
"Last White Christmas"
"Heavy Traffic"
"Union Games"
"Too Soon"
"Omega Man"

Personnel
Basement 5
Dennis Morris - vocals
J.R. - guitar
Leo Williams - bass
Richard Dudanski - drums
Charley Charles - drums
Technical
Chris Nagle - engineer
Kris Needs - management
Neil Clitheroe - design coordination
Dennis Morris - sleeve concept and design, photography

"Special thanks: Charles Charles - Trevor Spencer - Chris Blackwell - Denise Mills - Annie Roseberry - Rob Partridge - Glorious Gloria."

References

External links 

 

1980 debut albums
Basement 5 albums
Albums produced by Martin Hannett